Schwarzenbach is a Swiss German surname that may refer to
 Alfred Schwarzenbach (born 1941), Swiss Olympic equestrian
 Annemarie Schwarzenbach (1908–1942), Swiss author and journalist
 Blake Schwarzenbach (born 1967), American singer and guitarist
 Gerold Schwarzenbach (1904–1978), Swiss chemist
 Hans Schwarzenbach (1913–1993), Swiss Olympic equestrian
 James Schwarzenbach (1911–1994), Swiss politician, author and publisher
 Renée Schwarzenbach-Wille (1883–1959), Swiss photographer
 Urs Schwarzenbach (born 1948), Swiss financier

Swiss-German surnames